784 Pickeringia (prov. designation:  or ) is a large background asteroid, approximately  in diameter, located in the outer region of the asteroid belt. It was discovered on 20 March 1914, by American astronomer Joel Hastings Metcalf at the Winchester Observatory  in Massachusetts. The dark C-type asteroid has a rotation period of 13.1 hours and an irregular shape. It was named after American astronomers Edward Charles Pickering (1846–1919) and his brother William Henry Pickering (1858–1938).

Orbit and classification 

Pickeringia is a non-family asteroid of the main belt's background population when applying the hierarchical clustering method to its proper orbital elements. It orbits the Sun in the outer asteroid belt at a distance of 2.3–3.8 AU once every 5 years and 5 months (1,989 days; semi-major axis of 3.1 AU). Its orbit has an eccentricity of 0.24 and an inclination of 12° with respect to the ecliptic. The body's observation arc begins at Heidelberg Observatory on 30 September 1921, more than seven years after its official discovery observation at Winchester Observatory .

Naming 

This minor planet was named after American astronomers Edward Charles Pickering (1846–1919) and his brother William Henry Pickering (1858–1938), who were the directors of the Harvard Observatory and the Boyden Station at Arequipa, respectively. William Henry also discovered Phoebe, an irregular moon of Saturn. The  was mentioned in The Names of the Minor Planets by Paul Herget in 1955. The lunar crater Pickering and the Martian crater Pickering were also named in honor of the two astronomers.

Physical characteristics 

In the Bus–Binzel SMASS classification, Pickeringia is a common, carbonaceous C-type asteroid.

Rotation period 

In January 2017, a rotational lightcurve of Pickeringia was obtained from photometric observations by the Spanish group of asteroids observers (OBAS). Lightcurve analysis gave a rotation period of  hours with a brightness variation of  magnitude.

The result supersedes observations taken during the 1990s by European astronomers using the ESO 0.5-metre telescope at La Silla Observatory, Chile, which gave a period of  hours with an amplitude of  magnitude. as well as a period determination by French amateur astronomer Laurent Bernasconi in December 2004, which gave  and an amplitude of  magnitude.

Modeled lightcurve 

Each modeled lightcurve also determined two spin axes of (99.0°, 67.0°) and (283.0°, 30.0°), as well as (282.0°, 35.0°) and (103.0°, 68.0°) in ecliptic coordinates (λ, β), respectively. The online version of the Database of Asteroid Models from Inversion Techniques gives two poles at (103°, 68.0°) and (282°, 35.0°) with a nearly identical sidereal period.

Diameter and albedo 

These timed observations are taken when the asteroid passes in front of a distant star.

Notes

References

External links 
 Lightcurve Database Query (LCDB), at www.minorplanet.info
 Dictionary of Minor Planet Names, Google books
 Asteroids and comets rotation curves, CdR – Geneva Observatory, Raoul Behrend
 Discovery Circumstances: Numbered Minor Planets (1)-(5000) – Minor Planet Center
 
 

000784
Discoveries by Joel Hastings Metcalf
Named minor planets
000784
19140320